Moulins-sur-Yèvre (literally Moulins on Yèvre) is a commune in the Cher department in the Centre-Val de Loire region of France.

Geography

Population

Sights
 The church of St. Austrégésile, dating from the twelfth century.
 The chateau of Moulins.
 The fifteenth-century chateau of Maubranches.
 The chapel of Notre-Dame at Liesse, rebuilt in 1872.

See also
Communes of the Cher department

References

External links

Postcard photos of the commune 

Communes of Cher (department)